Highway 155 is a paved undivided highway in the Canadian province of Saskatchewan. It runs from Highway 55 near Green Lake until La Loche, where it intersects with Highway 955.

Communities accessible directly from Highway 155 are Green Lake, Buffalo Narrows, Landing, Bear Creek, and La Loche. Many provincial recreation sites are also accessible from Highway 155.

Highway 155 connects with Highways 55, 165, 965, 908, 925, 909, 956, and 955.

History
Highway 155 was begun in 1947 as a development road. It reached Buffalo Narrows in 1957 where a ferry was needed to cross the Kisis Channel. The road closely followed the path of the old wagon trail established by the Hudson's Bay Company. The official opening of Highway 155 from Green Lake to Buffalo Narrows was held in August 1963 in Green Lake. The old trail to La Loche was rebuilt soon after to become part of Highway 155. 

A bridge built in 1981 now crosses the Kisis Channel next to where the ferry was once located. The Kisis Channel connects Churchill Lake to Peter Pond Lake. In the 1980s the highway was straightened and paved.

Major intersections 
From south to north. The entire route is in the Northern Saskatchewan Administration District and Division No. 18.

See also 
Roads in Saskatchewan
Transportation in Saskatchewan

References

External links 

155